The parish church of St Bernadette is a Roman Catholic Church in Nunthorpe in the Diocese of Middlesbrough.

The parish priest is the Right Reverend Monsignor David Hogan, a canon lawyer and a Knight of the Order of the Holy Sepulchre.

External links

Churches in Middlesbrough
Roman Catholic churches in North Yorkshire
Roman Catholic Diocese of Middlesbrough